Timothy Robert Jankovich (born June 4, 1959) is a former American college basketball coach and former head coach at Southern Methodist University.  During his first year (2007–08) at Illinois State, Jankovich led the Redbirds to a 13–5 second-place finish in the Missouri Valley Conference – even though pre-season polls voted the team to be a fifth-place finisher.  He was an assistant basketball coach at Kansas for four years, and served under current Kansas head coach Bill Self at Kansas and Illinois.

He has also served as an assistant coach at Kansas State, Colorado State, Oklahoma State, Texas and Vanderbilt. He played college basketball at Washington State and Kansas State.

While at Colorado State, his teams posted three consecutive winning seasons en route to the best period of college basketball in school history. He also served for four years as the head basketball coach at North Texas. The team had gone 5–22 the previous season, but Jankovich engineered the second-largest turnaround in the nation that year.

Biography 
At Kansas State, Jankovich remains one of the winningest players in school history, playing under coach Jack Hartman. He was a four-year starter at point guard, but played his freshman season at Washington State. A three-time academic All-American and honorable mention All-Big Eight player, Jankovich finished his career at Kansas State in the school's top-10 in nine categories, including first in season free-throw percentage (.917) and eighth in career field-goal percentage (.510). In addition, he holds the Big Eight tournament record for single-game assists (14).

On April 26, SMU announced Jankovich as its associate head coach and coach-in-waiting, and was announced as head coach on July 8, 2016. On March 7, 2017, Jankovich was selected as the coach of the year  for USBWA district VII. On March 9, 2017, he was named American Athletic Conference Coach of the year.

On March 22, 2022, Jankovich announced his retirement.

Jankovich and his wife, Cindy, have a son, Michael. The family resides in Dallas, Texas.

Head coaching record

College

Junior college

Notes

References

External links
 SMU profile

1959 births
Living people
American men's basketball coaches
Basketball coaches from Indiana
Basketball players from Gary, Indiana
Baylor Bears men's basketball coaches
College men's basketball head coaches in the United States
Colorado State Rams men's basketball coaches
Hutchinson Blue Dragons men's basketball coaches
Illinois Fighting Illini men's basketball coaches
Illinois State Redbirds men's basketball coaches
Kansas Jayhawks men's basketball coaches
Kansas State Wildcats men's basketball coaches
Kansas State Wildcats men's basketball players
North Texas Mean Green men's basketball coaches
Oklahoma State Cowboys basketball coaches
SMU Mustangs men's basketball coaches
Sportspeople from Gary, Indiana
Texas Longhorns men's basketball coaches
UT Rio Grande Valley Vaqueros men's basketball coaches
Vanderbilt Commodores men's basketball coaches
Washington State Cougars men's basketball players
American men's basketball players
Point guards